Thibault De Smet (born 5 June 1998) is a Belgian professional footballer who plays as left-back for French Ligue 1 club Reims.

References

External links

1998 births
Living people
Belgian footballers
Belgium under-21 international footballers
Belgium youth international footballers
Association football fullbacks
Belgian Pro League players
Ligue 1 players
K.A.A. Gent players
Sint-Truidense V.V. players
Stade de Reims players
K Beerschot VA players
Belgian expatriate footballers
Belgian expatriate sportspeople in France
Expatriate footballers in France